Austin Amelio (born April 27, 1988) is an American actor best known for his role as Dwight in The Walking Dead and its spin-off Fear the Walking Dead and his role as Nesbit on Everybody Wants Some!!

Biography 
Born on April 27, 1988, in Austin, Texas, Amelio began his career in an array of short films. His most notable roles are Dwight on The Walking Dead and Nesbit in Everybody Wants Some!!.

Skateboarding background 
Amelio was an avid skateboarder, filming a part in and around Austin, Texas, for The Devil's Toy (2011). He was sponsored by No Comply Skate Shop and briefly received free product from Osiris shoes as a flow-sponsored rider. Amelio at one point solicited sponsorship from Karl Watson's Organika brand, also receiving a free deck and some lasting advice from the senior Bay Area skateboarder. In April 2017, Amelio appeared on The Nine Club skateboarding podcast hosted by Chris Roberts, Roger Bagley, and Kelly Hart. He was previously interviewed by Transworld Skateboarding.

Filmography

Film

Television

References

External links 
 

1988 births
Living people
Male actors from Austin, Texas
American male television actors
21st-century American male actors